A castaway is a person cast adrift or ashore.

Castaway or Cast Away may also refer to:

Literature
"The Castaways" (short story), P.G. Wodehouse
Castaway (book), a 1984 memoir by Lucy Irvine
The Castaway, Hallie Erminie Rives's 1904 novel that was the subject of Bobbs-Merrill Co. v. Straus, a landmark US copyright case
"The Castaway" (poem), an 1799 poem/ballad by William Cowper

Film and TV
The Castaways (1910 film), 1910 film

Cast Away, a 2000 film starring Tom Hanks

Castaway (film), a 1986 film starring Amanda Donohoe and Oliver Reed, adapted from the Lucy Irvine memoir

Castaway 2000, a BBC series
Castaway 2007, a BBC series
Castaways (1978 TV series), a 1978 historical drama series featuring Annie Whittle
Castaway (TV series), a 2011 Australian television series
Castaways (TV series), an American reality television series produced by ABC
The Castaway (film), a 1931 Mickey Mouse animated short
The Castaways, an animated film

Music
The Castaways, an American garage rock band
Cast Away (album), a 2004 album by Visions of Atlantis
Cast Away, a 2013 album by Strange Talk
"Castaway" (Zac Brown Band song), from Jekyll + Hyde
"Castaway" (Mi-Sex song), a 1982 song by Mi-Sex
"Castaway", a song by 5 Seconds of Summer from Sounds Good Feels Good
"Castaway", a song by Benny Benassi from ...Phobia
"Castaway", a song by Dog Fashion Disco from Committed to a Bright Future
"Castaway", a song by Green Day from Warning
"Castaway", a song by Jerry Cantrell from Degradation Trip
"Castaway", a song by Mike Oldfield from Man on the Rocks
"Castaway", a song by Paul Van Dyk from In Between
"Castaway", a song by Yuna from Rouge
"Castaway", a song from In Search of the Castaways
"Castaways" (Backyardigans song), a song from the children's show The Backyardigans which became a popular meme song.
"The Castaway", a song by Amorphis from Tales from the Thousand Lakes
Castaway (opera), an opera by Lennox Berkeley

Other uses
Castaways' Club, a club for Royal Navy officers who left the service whilst still young
Castaways (casino), a former Las Vegas, Nevada hotel 
Castaway Cay, a private island operated by the Walt Disney Company
Castaway Entertainment, a software company
Castaway Island, a tourist resort in the Mamanuca Island group in Fiji
Castaways Hotel and Casino, a former Las Vegas hotel and casino

See also
In Search of the Castaways, by Jules Verne (1868)
 In Search of the Castaways (film), a 1962 Walt Disney Productions feature film
 Johnny Castaway, a screensaver from 1992